Damaged goods or Damaged Goods may refer to:

 Goods that have been damaged, where goods are items that satisfy human wants and provide utility

Film and theatre
 Damaged Goods (play), a 1901 play by Eugène Brieux, published in French as Les Avariés
 Damaged Goods (1914 film), an American silent film based on the play
 Damaged Goods (1919 film), a British silent film based on the play
 Damaged Goods (1937 film), an American drama film based on the play
 Damaged Goods, a 2008 animated film by Barnaby Barford
 "Damaged Goods", a segment of The Turning (2013 film)

Literature
 Damaged Goods (Davies novel), a 1996 original Doctor Who novel
 Damaged Goods, a 2012 novel by Alexandra Allred
 "Damaged Goods", a short story in The Turning (short story collection)

Music
 Damaged Goods (record label), a British independent record label
 Damaged Goods, a 2011 album by Hellbound Glory
 Damaged Goods, a 2006 album by Lennon Murphy
 Damaged Goods, a 2000 album by The Great Crusades
 Damaged Goods, a 2012 album by The Mohawk Lodge
 Damaged Goods, a 2018 album by Sinead Burgess
 "Damaged Goods" (song), by Gang of Four, 1978
 "Damaged Goods", a song by La Dispute from the 2008 album Somewhere at the Bottom of the River Between Vega and Altair
 Damaged Good, a 2016 album by Bettie Serveert

Other uses
 Damaged Goods, a dance company of Meg Stuart, from 1994
 "Damaged Goods", an episode of Pacific Blue season 4, 1998

See also

Good (disambiguation)
Crippleware, computer software or hardware with disabled features
 Emotional conflict 
 Damaged Lives, a 1933 Canadian/American film based on Brieux's play